Rogue Nature is a reality television program broadcast in the United States on Discovery Channel, Discovery HD Theater, and Animal Planet. The show follows host, biologist Dave Salmoni, as he explores nature's most dangerous animals to determine if they really do intentionally kill humans.

Summary 

Each episode typically involves Dave Salmoni talking with people who have had experience with the featured animal before. These people include victims of the animal and experts on the animal (occasionally including two separate experts who disagree as to whether the animal is dangerous or not, as in the case of black bears). He will usually interact with the animal in a domesticated setting before heading out to get close to the animal in its natural habitat.

Episodes 

Bear
Chimp
Squid
Hippo/Croc
Elephant
Lion

Animal Planet broadcasts 

As the Animal Planet channel is generated at younger viewers, the episodes were re-edited for content. While the second episode, "Chimps", was not included in the initial run, it has been aired in reruns.

External links 
 Episode Listing for Discovery HD
 Episode Listing for Animal Planet

Animal Planet original programming
Discovery Channel original programming
2007 American television series debuts
2007 American television series endings